Carex douglasii is a species of sedge known by the common name Douglas' sedge.

Distribution
It is native to much of western North America, including the western Canadian provinces, the western United States, and Baja California. It grows in dry, wet, and seasonally moist habitat, from prairie and grassland to marshes. It is tolerant of sandy and alkaline substrates.

Description
Carex douglasii is a sedge producing triangular stems up to about 40 centimeters high from thin rhizomes. The leaves are thick but narrow and sometimes rolled. The plant is dioecious, with male and female flowers occurring on different individuals. The pistillate inflorescence is distinctive, with female flowers bearing long, protruding, persistent stigmas that tangle together into a wide mass.

External links
Jepson Manual Treatment - Carex douglasii
USDA Plants Profile
Flora of North America
Carex douglasii - Photo gallery

douglasii
Flora of North America
Plants described in 1839
Dioecious plants